Edith Amituanai  (born 1980) is a New Zealand photographic artist. In 2007, she was the inaugural recipient of the Marti Friedlander Photographic Award. Examples of her work are held in the collections of Te Papa, Auckland Art Gallery, and the Govett-Brewster Art Gallery.

Biography 
Amituanai was born in Auckland in 1980 to parents who had emigrated from Samoa. She was raised in Christchurch and now is located in Ranui, West Auckland.

In 2005, Amituanai completed a Bachelor of Design at Unitec Institute of Technology. Amituanai's photography first came to the attention of the art world while she attended Unitec, when her work was included in the Break/Shift exhibition (2004) at the Govett-Brewster Art Gallery. Her work was later included in the Lara Strongman book Contemporary New Zealand Photographers (2006), documenting her work as an emerging artist. In 2009 she completed her Masters of Fine Arts from Elam School of Fine Arts at the University of Auckland. In 2008 she was the first Pasifika artist to be nominated for the Walters Prize for Déjeuner, an exhibition depicting her cousin after a rugby practice session in France.

In 2015, Amituanai founded ETA (Edith’s Talent Agency), an art project documenting the communities near her local suburb of Ranui. She is also the arts co-ordinator at Ranui Action Project, a local community development programme.

2019 was the first survey exhibition of her work at the Adams Art gallery in Wellington curated by Ema Tonga and included over 60 of her photographs. Amittuanai received the KLM Paul Huf Award, Amsterdam, and in 2019 Amituanai was appointed a Member of the New Zealand Order of Merit in the 2019 Queen's Birthday Honours, for services to photography and community.

Her artwork is held in the collections of Te Papa (the national museum of New Zealand), Govett-Brewster Art Gallery and the Auckland Art Gallery Toi o Tāmaki.

Artistry 
Amituanai's photography focuses on diaspora experiences in New Zealand, family communities, urban environments and amplifying unseen and unheard people. Many of her works depict Pasifika in Aotearoa, and transnational domestic interiors of Samoan diaspora houses. Amituanai is inspired by documentary photography, and has a commitment to community engagement with her subjects. Amituanai's documentation of diaspora communities in West Auckland have been described as challenging the dominant myth that West Auckland is primarily a European area. Her work features aspects of both straight documentary photography and staged photography.

Her works variously confront her parents' cultural values in a new context, celebrate her parents' generation's Samoan traditions such as marriage in a New Zealand context, and document the ways in which Pasifika communities establish new lives while maintaining connections to their homeland.

Personal life 
Amituanai got married in 2005. At the time, she was the first "Mrs Amituanai" in her husband's household for 14 years, after the untimely death of his mother.

Residencies 
 2014 – Taipei Artist Village resident.
 2017 – Flaxmere’s Kimi Ora Community School.

Books 
Keep on Kimi Ora (2018) –  – collaboration with Kimi Ora Primary School in Flaxmere.

Exhibitions 
2006 –  Mrs Amituanai. RAMP Gallery, Waikato Institute of Technology, City Campus (Hamilton.)
2013 – Through the Key Hole. Collaboration with Claire Harris and Erwin Olaf. Enjoy Contemporary Art Space, Wellington.
2013–2014 – La fine del mondo, Auckland Art Gallery. Auckland. (Part of Freedom Farmers: New Zealand.) 
2019 – Double Take. Survey exhibition. Adam Art Gallery, Wellington, Curated by Ane Tonga.
2020–2021– In Our Sea of Island's. Collaboration with George Crummer. The Homestead Galleries, Auckland.   
2021 – The Moon Was Talking, Collaboration with Kelston Girls College, Te Uru Waitākere Contemporary Gallery. Auckland.
2021 – ‘La’u Pele Moana (My darling Moana)’ series. QAGOMA’s landmark exhibition series.The Gallery of Modern Art (Queensland Art Gallery).

Group exhibitions
2004 – Break/Shift, the Govett-Brewster Art Gallery, New Plymouth
2013 – Pictures They Want to Make: Recent Auckland Photography Northart, Auckland, 20 May – 12 June 2013.
2021 – Time Drag Anna Miles Gallery, Auckland. 30 May – 3 July 2021.

Awards 
2007 – Marti Friedlander Photographic Award
2008 – Walters Prize nominee (first nominee of Pacific descent.)

References 

21st-century New Zealand women artists
21st-century women photographers
Artists from Auckland
Living people
Members of the New Zealand Order of Merit
New Zealand people of Samoan descent
New Zealand photographers
New Zealand women photographers
Samoan artists
Artists from Christchurch
1980 births
Photographers from Auckland